John Condit (Democratic-Republican) of  resigned to become assistant collector of the Port of New York.

Charles Kinsey (also Democratic-Republican) was elected February 2, 1820 to replace him.  Kinsey had previously served as a member from New Jersey but had lost re-election to Condit in 1818.

He was seated February 16, 1820.

See also 
 1818 and 1819 United States House of Representatives elections
 List of United States representatives from New Jersey

References

External links 
 

1820
New Jersey
United States House of Representatives
New Jersey 1820 at-large
New Jersey 1820 at-large
United States House of Representatives 1820 at-large